Okoli may refer to:

People
Amelia Okoli (1941–2017), Nigerian track and field athlete
Emmanuel Okoli (born 1973), Nigerian sprinter
James Okoli (born 1976), Nigerian football player
Mobi Okoli (born 1987), Nigerian football player

Places
 Okoli, Croatia, small community with major natural gas pipeline storage area near Velika Ludina, Croatia